Inglisild ('Angel's Bridge') is a bridge in Toomemägi, Tartu, Estonia.

The bridge was built between 1814 and 1816 and was designed by Johann Wilhelm Krause. Later, the bridge was somewhat re-built and in 1836 construction works ended. The rebuilt structure was designed by Moritz Hermann von Jacobi.

It is supposed that the name of bridge is very likely a corruption of the original "Englische Brücke" or "English bridge".

The portrait relief in the middle of the bridge commemorates the first rector of the re-founded University of Tartu in 1802, Georg Friedrich Parrot (1767–1852), and bears the inscription Otium reficit vires ('Leisure Renews the Powers').

On 21 April 2012 the bridge was damaged by fire.

See also
Kuradisild ('Devil's Bridge')

References

External links

Bridges in Tartu